Benedict Martin Paul Mulroney (born March 9, 1976) is a Canadian producer and former television host. He is the eldest son of Brian Mulroney, the 18th Prime Minister of Canada.

Best known for his 20-year broadcasting career with the Canadian network CTV, Mulroney began as an entertainment reporter on CTV's former morning show Canada AM in 2001, and co-hosted the entertainment news program etalk from 2002 to 2020, Canadian Idol from 2003 to 2008, and CTV's national morning show Your Morning from 2016 to 2021. Mulroney departed etalk in June 2020. A year later, on September 29, 2021, Mulroney departed both Your Morning and CTV to pursue a producing career.

Early life and education
Mulroney was born in Montreal, Quebec and grew up in Ottawa, Ontario. He is the second of four children born to former Canadian Prime Minister Brian Mulroney and Mila Pivnicki Mulroney, who is of Serbian descent. Mulroney is one of several children of former Prime Ministers who became Canadian media personalities between 1998 and 2001.

His older sister, Caroline, is the Minister of Transportation for Ontario having been an unsuccessful candidate for the 2018 Ontario Progressive Conservative leadership election. Maclean's later revealed that he helped her rehearse scripts during the leadership campaign.

Mulroney attended Lycée Claudel d'Ottawa and the Hotchkiss School and earned a Bachelor of Arts degree, with a major in history, from Duke University. He subsequently earned a Bachelor of Laws degree from Université Laval. During the Oliphant hearings, it was revealed that all the Mulroney children's university education was paid from the money that his father received from Karlheinz Schreiber.

Career
In the late 1990s, Mulroney wrote a regular column for the Toronto Sun. He began his career as an entertainment reporter as the Quebec City correspondent for The Chatroom in 2000 on CTV-owned digital channel Talktv and became one of five co-hosts of the show in July 2001. From 2001 to 2002, he was entertainment reporter on Canada AM. He hosted Canadian Idol from 2003 to 2008.

CTV: etalk
Mulroney is best known as the former host of the entertainment news program etalk from 2002 to 2020, where he covered major events in entertainment, including the Oscars, the Golden Globes, and the Juno Awards.
In April 2009, Mulroney added radio show host to his résumé with the launch of the CHUM Radio show, etalk 20. The two-hour radio program was broadcast on 11 radio stations across Canada and counted down the top 20 chart-topping hits and includes celebrity interviews.

In 2006, he was appointed as the National Ambassador for UNICEF Canada. In February 2010, Mulroney and other staff from etalk covered the Vancouver 2010 Olympic Winter Games for CTV.

On June 22, 2020, Mulroney announced his resignation as host of etalk saying, "More than ever, we need more Black voices, more Indigenous voices, more people of colour in the media as well as every other profession – and that is why I have decided to immediately step away from my role at etalk to create space for a new perspective and a new voice." His resignation came in the wake of a controversy in which his wife was accused of harassing Sasha Exeter, a black influencer.

Your Morning
In June 2016, he was announced as the cohost, with Anne-Marie Mediwake, of CTV's new morning show Your Morning, which replaced the venerable Canada AM. He left the program, effective October 1, 2021, in order to "pursue a career as a producer, developing unique projects for both Canadian and global audiences".

American career
Mulroney joined ABC News in June 2012 as a contributor to Good Morning America. Former ABC News President Ben Sherwood announced that Mulroney would be temporarily substituting for Dan Harris during the weekends, while serving as contributor to Good Morning America. This was followed after Mulroney's previous stints as temporary co-host with Kelly Ripa on Live with Kelly.

Personal life

Mulroney became engaged to his girlfriend of one year, fashion designer and stylist Jessica Brownstein, on December 28, 2007 in Montreal. They were married on October 30, 2008 in a private ceremony at St. Patrick's Basilica, Montreal. Mulroney first met Brownstein when they were both teenagers through his younger brother Mark, who was a student at the all-boys Selwyn House School during the same time she was a student at sister school Miss Edgar's and Miss Cramp's School.

They have 3 children: sons, who are fraternal twins, Brian Gerald Alexander Mulroney and John Benedict Dimitri Mulroney (born August 12, 2010) and daughter Isabel Veronica Mulroney  known as "Ivy" (born June 12, 2013).

Ben and Jessica Mulroney attended the 2018 wedding of Prince Harry and Meghan Markle, and their three children participated as page boys and flower girl.

References

External links
 Ben Mulroney Biography
 
 Ben Mulroney Biography in "Duke Magazine"  
 

1976 births
Anglophone Quebec people
Canadian columnists
Canadian game show hosts
Canadian Idol
Canadian people of Irish descent
Canadian people of Serbian descent
Children of prime ministers of Canada
Hotchkiss School alumni
Duke University Trinity College of Arts and Sciences alumni
Living people
People from Montreal
People from Ottawa
Université Laval alumni
Canadian infotainers
Brian Mulroney
Université Laval Faculté de droit alumni
CTV Television Network people
Mulroney family